Richard Kieckhefer (born 1946) is an American medievalist, religious historian, scholar of church architecture, and author. He is Professor of History and John Evans Professor of Religious Studies at Northwestern University.

Education
After an undergraduate education at Saint Louis University, Kieckhefer earned a PhD in history from the University of Texas in 1972, spending a year in Munich at the Monumenta Germaniae Historica Institute with the support of the German Academic Exchange Service (DAAD).

Career
Kieckhefer has written on sainthood, medieval ritual magic, witchcraft, medieval and contemporary church architecture, hoopoes, and mystical literature; he has also edited and translated important texts from medieval Latin. He has taught at Northwestern University since 1975. His Magic in the Middle Ages, first published in 1989, has been translated into Spanish, German, Polish, Czech, Italian, and Greek, and is forthcoming in Turkish, Portuguese, and Korean. He was President of the American Society of Church History in 1997 and of the Societas Magica from 1995 to 2004.

Awards
In addition to the DAAD, his research has been supported by the Guggenheim Foundation, the American Council of Learned Societies, and the National Endowment for the Humanities. In 2006, he was elected a member of the American Academy of Arts and Sciences.

Works
 European Witch Trials: Their Foundations in Popular and Learned Culture, 1300–1500 (1976)
 Repression of Heresy in Medieval Germany (1979)
 Magic in the Middle Ages (1989)
 Forbidden Rites: A Necromancer's Manual of the Fifteenth Century (1997)
 Theology in Stone: Church Architecture From Byzantium to Berkeley (2004)
 There Once Was a Serpent: A History of Theology in Limericks (2010)

References

External links
 Richard Kieckhefer's faculty profile
 Kieckhefer's publications on Northwestern Scholars
 Richard Kieckhefer on Library Thing
 An interview with Richard Kieckhefer by Vinna Harper

American medievalists
Northwestern University faculty
Living people
20th-century American non-fiction writers
21st-century American non-fiction writers
University of Texas alumni
Saint Louis University alumni
Fellows of the American Academy of Arts and Sciences
Writers from Illinois
Fellows of the Medieval Academy of America
Western esotericism scholars
Presidents of the American Society of Church History
1946 births